is a large trans-Neptunian object in the scattered disc, around  in diameter. It was discovered on 17 February 2021, by American astronomers Scott Sheppard, David Tholen, and Chad Trujillo using the 8.2-meter Subaru Telescope of the Mauna Kea Observatories in Hawaii, and announced on 17 December 2021. It was 89.4 astronomical units from the Sun when it was discovered, making it one of the most distant known Solar System objects from the Sun . It has been identified in several precovery images as far back as 10 March 2005.

References

External links 
 
 

Minor planet object articles (unnumbered)

20210217